James Irvin Adams (September 27, 1890 – June 18, 1937) was a pitcher for the St. Louis Browns, Pittsburgh Rebels, and Philadelphia Athletics. He attended Albright College prior to his playing career.

He led the American League in earned runs allowed (83) and hit batters (12) in 1918.

In 5 years he had an 8–16 win–loss record, 65 games, 21 games started, 8 complete games, 30 games finished, 2 saves,  innings pitched, 303 hits allowed, 172 runs allowed, 138 earned runs allowed, 8 home runs allowed, 144 walks allowed, 74 strikeouts, 19 hit batsmen, 8 wild pitches, 1,238 batters faced and a 4.37 ERA.

While an active player in the minor leagues in 1922, Adams suffered a heart attack, which ended his baseball career.

He died in Albany, New York, at the age of 46.

References

External links

1890 births
1937 deaths
People from Clearfield, Pennsylvania
Albright Lions baseball players
Baseball players from Pennsylvania
Major League Baseball pitchers
St. Louis Browns players
Pittsburgh Rebels players
Philadelphia Athletics players
Pawtucket Rovers players
Richmond Virginians (minor league) players
Atlanta Crackers players
Hartford Senators players